Peenie Petroglyph Archeological Site, also known as the Missouri Archeological Survey Number 23GA21 , is a historic archaeological site located near  Bem, Gasconade County, Missouri. The site was documented during 1958, and includes petroglyphs identified as a crescent, star/supernova and rabbit tracks.

It was listed on the National Register of Historic Places in 1969.

References

Archaeological sites on the National Register of Historic Places in Missouri
Buildings and structures in Gasconade County, Missouri
National Register of Historic Places in Gasconade County, Missouri